Quebracho Herrado is a small community in San Justo Department of Córdoba Province, Argentina. It was the location of the famous Battle of Quebracho Herrado in 1840 during the civil wars. The town has about 317 inhabitants.

Climate

Winter temperatures may fall below  and summer temperatures may rise above . 

History

In the early nineteenth century, among the grasslands and thorn bushes that covered the interior of Argentina, there was a grove of quebracho trees (Schinopsis lorentzii) beside the cart track linking Córdoba to Santa Fe Province.  A horseshoe was nailed to the trunk of the highest, which define the boundary between the provinces of Córdoba and Santa Fe. The name Quebracho Herrado refers to this tree, meaning "shod quebracho".

In 1816 the Buenos Aires government established a fort here, the Fuerte Posta de Quebracho Herrado.

The latter were victorious.
After the Unitarians took power in Argentina a few years later, the site of the battle was called Campo Lavalle.

Economy

The main economic activity is agriculture followed by livestock raising.
The main crops are soybeans and corn. Milk production and tourism are also important in the local economy.
The town has a dispensary, a primary school, a police station and a community building in which most of the administrative functions are based.

References
Citations

Sources

Populated places in Córdoba Province, Argentina